Micropsyrassa glabrata is a species of beetle in the family Cerambycidae. It was described by Martins and Chemsak in 1966.

References

Elaphidiini
Beetles described in 1966